This is a list of all lighthouses in the U.S. state of Alabama as identified by the United States Coast Guard and other historical sources. There is only one active light in the state, though another has been replaced by a skeleton tower; a third still stands but is inactive. The rest have all been destroyed.

Focal height and coordinates are taken from the 1907 United States Coast Guard Light List, while location and dates of activation, automation, and deactivation are taken from the United States Coast Guard Historical information site for lighthouses.

References

Alabama
 
Lighthouses